Albano Vercellese is a comune (municipality) in the Province of Vercelli in the Italian region Piedmont, located about  northeast of Turin and about  north of Vercelli.

Despite the Roman toponym, Albano is documented only from the 10th century. In 1335 it became a fief of the Visconti of Milan. It became part of the Duchy of Savoy in 1407.

Albano Vercellese borders the following municipalities: Collobiano, Greggio, Oldenico, San Nazzaro Sesia, and Villarboit. It is home to a castle which has maintained parts from the 14th century. The apse of the Oratory of the Holy Trinity has 15th-century frescoes.

References

Cities and towns in Piedmont